Kuris is a village in the Meghri Municipality of the Syunik Province in Armenia.

Demographics 
The Statistical Committee of Armenia reported its population was 61 in 2010, down from 112 at the 2001 census. The inhabitants speak the Kakavaberd dialect of Armenian.

References 

Populated places in Syunik Province